Giannis Siderakis (born 16 November 1987) is a Greek professional football player.

Until 2006 he was a member of the youth team of Olympiacos.

Career

He started in the youth section of the Olympiakos and until 2006 was a member of the u17 team. In 2007, he was transferred to AO Haidari, where he played 2.5 years. Then he fought Apollo Smyrna in the second half of the season in 2009-10 and in 2010-11 was an eventful year in Thrasivoulos Filis.

Panionios
In the summer of 2011 he joined Panionios, which debuted in the Superleague on August 28, the first day of the season 2011-12, against Ergotelis in the Nea Smyrni Stadium. One of the top moments in neosmyrniotiko club was on January 11, 2012 in a home cup match against Panathinaikos (0-0, 4-3 penalties) when he saved two chipped penalty that executed by Karagounis and Leto gave the qualification to Panionios.

Kalloni, Cyprus and return
Between 2013-14 he defended the goal of Kalloni, where he had 25 appearances in the league, followed a years in the Cyprus league where he played with the colors of Glory Katokopia. In the following period (2015–16) returned to Kalloni but was sold immediately to Aris. He made his debut in a 3-1 win over Apollon Kalamarias. Two weeks later against Eordaikos he made a number of crucial saves to keep nine-man Aris in the game for an eventual 2-1 win.

References

External links

1987 births
Living people
Greek expatriate footballers
Super League Greece players
Cypriot First Division players
Chaidari F.C. players
Apollon Smyrnis F.C. players
Thrasyvoulos F.C. players
Panionios F.C. players
Doxa Katokopias FC players
Olympiacos F.C. players
Association football goalkeepers
Footballers from Athens
Greek footballers